The first season of Battle of the Blades debuted on CBC on October 4, 2009. Eight former NHL ice hockey players were paired with eight professional female figure skaters.

Ron MacLean and Kurt Browning were the hosts for this season. Pairs figure skater and Emmy Award winning choreographer Sandra Bezic was the head judge, with Olympic figure skating champion Dick Button being the other regular judge. Each week had one rotating guest judge.  Also, there was a set theme each week that the couples must perform in.

The elimination format is that the couples are scored on their Sunday night performance, but only as a reference guide for the viewers to vote on. The bottom two couples are based solely on the lowest number of viewer votes. On Monday, the bottom two couples are revealed and they skate their Sunday night program once more in the Skate-Off and are then scored by the judges. The couple with the lower judges score from their Monday night performance is then eliminated.

Couples 
On June 23, 2009, CBC announced the show along with the first six male competitors. On August 12, 2009, CBC announced the eight female professional figure stakers. The remaining two male competitors and the rest of the cast were announced on August 13, 2009.

Scoring Chart
Red numbers indicate the couples with the lowest score for each week.
Green numbers indicate the couples with the highest score for each week.
 indicates the couple (or couples) eliminated that week.
 indicates the returning couple that finished in the bottom two.
 indicates the couple withdrew from the competition.
 indicates the winning couple.
 indicates the runner-up couple.
 indicates the third-place couple.

In Week 6, even though Craig & Jamie and Stéphane & Marie-France were announced as the bottom two couples, no elimination took place as Marie-France Dubreuil had a back injury during practice and was unable to perform in the Skate-Off.  Therefore, head judge Sandra Bezic declared that all three couples would move on to Week 7.

Skate-Off Chart

Average chart 

Note: Skate-Off scores are not included in this chart.  Only Sunday night performances are averaged.

Weekly themes and guest judges

Individual scores & songs

Week 1
Individual judges scores in charts below (given in parentheses) are listed in this order from left to right:  Kelly Hrudey, Sandra Bezic, Dick Button.
Running order

Week 2
Individual judges scores in charts below (given in parentheses) are listed in this order from left to right:  Don Cherry, Sandra Bezic, Dick Button.

Week 3
Individual judges scores in charts below (given in parentheses) are listed in this order from left to right:  George Stroumboulopoulos, Sandra Bezic, Dick Button.
Running order

Week 4
Individual judges scores in charts below (given in parentheses) are listed in this order from left to right:  Lanny McDonald, Sandra Bezic, Dick Button.
Running order

Week 5
Individual judges scores in charts below (given in parentheses) are listed in this order from left to right:  Bret Hedican and Kristi Yamaguchi, Sandra Bezic, Dick Button.
Running order

Week 6
Individual judges scores in charts below (given in parentheses) are listed in this order from left to right:  Katarina Witt, Sandra Bezic, Dick Button.
Running order

Week 7
Individual judges scores in charts below (given in parentheses) are listed in this order from left to right:  Doug Gilmour, Sandra Bezic, Dick Button.
Running order

Weekly ratings
Weekly ratings and rankings are measured by BBM Canada, an audience measurement organization for Canadian television and radio broadcasting.

References

External links
 Official website
 Battle of the Blades at IMDb
 Battle of the Blades Oct 09 interviews with the cast from Season One.

Season 01
2009 Canadian television seasons